Luca Matarese (born 16 April 1998) is an Italian footballer who plays as a forward for  club Frosinone.

Club career
Matarese made his Serie B debut for Frosinone on 23 September 2017 in a game against Perugia.

On 31 January 2019, he joined Foggia on loan.

On 5 October 2020, he signed with Casertana.

On 28 August 2021, he was loaned to Imolese.

References

External links
 

1998 births
Living people
People from Scafati
Sportspeople from the Province of Salerno
Footballers from Campania
Italian footballers
Association football forwards
Serie A players
Serie B players
Serie C players
Genoa C.F.C. players
Frosinone Calcio players
Calcio Foggia 1920 players
Casertana F.C. players
Imolese Calcio 1919 players
Italy youth international footballers